Muzaffar Ahmed may refer to:

 Muzaffar Ahmed (politician) (1889–1973), Indian Bengali politician, journalist and communist activist
 Muzaffar Ahmed (economist) (1936–2012), Bangladeshi economist
 Muzaffar Ahmed (NAP Politician) (1922–2019), advisor in Provisional Government of Bangladesh during wartime in 1971